The Volkswagen ID.7 is an upcoming electric vehicle produced by Volkswagen in the ID range. It is scheduled to be launched in 2023 and replace the Passat.

On January 4th, 2023, Volkswagen presented the production version at the Consumer Electronics Show in Las Vegas.

Overview

Concept
It was previewed by the Volkswagen ID. Aero concept in June 2022.

Production version
Camouflaged prototypes have been spied multiple times testing.

References

Production electric cars
Upcoming car models
Cars introduced in 2023